Forrest Fire is an album by saxophonist Jimmy Forrest recorded in 1960 and released on the New Jazz label.

Reception

Scott Yanow of Allmusic described the album as "excellent music that is also quite accessible".

Track listing 
All compositions by Jimmy Forrest except as indicated
 "Remember" (Irving Berlin) - 5:27  
 "Dexter's Deck" (Dexter Gordon) - 6:37  
 "Jim's Jam" - 8:54  
 "Bags' Groove" (Milt Jackson) - 8:25  
 "When Your Lover Has Gone" (Einar Aaron Swan) - 5:27  
 "Help!" (Doug Watkins) - 4:49

Personnel 
Jimmy Forrest - tenor saxophone
Larry Young - organ
Thornel Schwartz - guitar
Jimmie Smith - drums
Unknown - congas

Production
Esmond Edwards - supervisor
Rudy Van Gelder - engineer

References 

Jimmy Forrest albums
1960 albums
New Jazz Records albums
Albums recorded at Van Gelder Studio
Albums produced by Esmond Edwards